Colin Shields (born 27 January 1980) is a former Scottish professional ice hockey forward who played most of his career in the United Kingdom's Elite Ice Hockey League (EIHL). He is the EIHL's all-time leading point scorer.

Playing career

Amateur
Shields started his career in North America and played for Cleveland Jr. Barons in the NAHL for two seasons, 1998–2000. Shields was a sixth-round pick for the Philadelphia Flyers in the 2000 NHL Entry Draft. Shields opted to attend and play for the University of Maine for three seasons, finishing as the top scorer for the 2003–04 season.

Professional
For the 2004–05 season Shields was split between the San Diego Gulls, Atlantic City Boardwalk Bullies and Greenville Grrrowl of the ECHL, tallying 35 points in 62 games. For 2005–06, Shields moved back to his native United Kingdom for a spell with the Belfast Giants of the EIHL, where he played alongside former NHL star Theoren Fleury. 2006–07 saw a return to the ECHL, with 43 points in 57 games for the Fresno Falcons and Idaho Steelheads. Shields had a career year in 2007–08 for the Newcastle Vipers of the EIHL, scoring 73 points in 57 games. This led to a two-year contract with the Belfast Giants.  Shields served as captain of the Giants, replacing George Awada, who was ruled out with injury.

On 7 April 2011, it was announced that Shields had left the Giants to sign for Morzine-Avoriaz in France.

On 22 March 2012, it was announced that Shields had signed to play the 2012–13 season for the Sheffield Steelers in the EIHL.

Retirement and life after hockey

He announced his retirement effective from the end of the 2018–19 season on 26 March 2019.

In November 2021, Shields was inducted into the Ice Hockey UK Hall of Fame.

Ahead of the 2022-23 Elite League season, Shields was announced as a new addition to the Premier Sports broadcast team - alongside Aaron Murphy, Paul Adey and Angela Taylor.

Career statistics

Regular season and playoffs

International

Awards and honours

References

External links

1980 births
Atlantic City Boardwalk Bullies players
Belfast Giants players
British expatriate ice hockey people
Fresno Falcons players
Greenville Grrrowl players
HC Morzine-Avoriaz players
Idaho Steelheads (ECHL) players
Living people
Maine Black Bears men's ice hockey players
Newcastle Vipers players
Philadelphia Flyers draft picks
San Diego Gulls (ECHL) players
Scottish expatriate sportspeople in the United States
Scottish ice hockey centres
Sheffield Steelers players
Sportspeople from Glasgow
AHCA Division I men's ice hockey All-Americans
Scottish expatriate sportspeople in France
Scottish expatriate sportspeople in Canada
Expatriate ice hockey players in the United States
Expatriate ice hockey players in Canada
Expatriate ice hockey players in France